Pench Tiger Reserve or Pench National Park is one of the premier tiger reserves of India and the first one to straddle across two states - Madhya Pradesh and Maharashtra. The reference to Pench is mostly to the tiger reserve in Madhya Pradesh.

The portion of the reserve that is in Madhya Pradesh is nestled in the southern slopes of the Satpura range of Central India. Pench Tiger Reserve comprises the Indira Priyadarshini Pench National Park, the Pench Mowgli Sanctuary and a buffer. It is the same forest area portrayed in the famous "The Jungle Book" by Rudyard Kipling. It derives its name from its life line - the River Pench. Inside the park, the river flows from North to South before going on to join the Kanhan River, while splitting the Park into two, and forming the boundary of Seoni District and Chhindwara District districts of Madhya Pradesh. The Meghdoot dam built across Pench River at Totladoh has created a large water body of 72 km2 out of which 54 km2 falls in M.P. and the rest in the adjoining state of Maharashtra. The Pench River which emerges from Mahadeo Hills of Satpuda Ranges and the various nallas and streams which drain into it, all flow through the forests of the protected area. The Satpuda ranges which bear the forests of the Protected Area act as an excellent watershed area for the Totladoh as well as lower Pench Reservoirs.

On the Madhya Pradesh side, the Pench Tiger Reserve encompasses a core area of 411.33 km2, with a buffer of 768.3 km2., making for a total protected area of 1179.63 km2. The core area includes the Mowgli Pench Wildlife Sanctuary whose area is 118.30 km2. The Buffer Zone is constituted by Reserve Forests, Protected Forests and Revenue land

Located south of the tiger reserve area in Madhya Pradesh, is the Pench Tiger Reserve, Maharashtra. On the Maharashtra side, the Pench Tiger Reserve has a core habitat area of 257.3 km2 along with a buffer/peripheral area of 483.96 km2. of the Mansinghdeo Sanctuary, making for a total protected area 741.2 km2. Spanning over a total protected region of over 1920 km2., both these tiger reserves are included in the Level 1,  Tiger Conservation Unit – 31 (Kanha-Pench TCU). As per many experts, this area is considered one of the most prime and critical tiger habitat remaining in central India. As of May 2017, the number of tigers in Pench Tiger Reserve has increased up to 44 as compared to 31 in 2016. From this numbered estimate, 22 are males and 22 are females. This estimate does not include the number of cubs present, which are assumed to be about 7 - 8. The estimation was conducted jointly by the Wildlife Conservation Trust (WCT) and Pench Tiger Foundation, spread over 21 days in January 2017.

Location
The Reserve gets its name from the Pench River that flows, north to south, 74 km through the reserve. The Pench River bisects the original Pench core reserve into two nearly equal parts; the 147.61 km² of the Western Block which falls in the Gumtara Range of the Chhindwara Forest Division and the 145.24 km² of the Eastern Block in the Karmajhiri Range of the Seoni Forest Division. See: Map 1.

The adjoining forests to the west and north-west of the Tiger Reserve come under the East Chhindwara and South Chhindwara Territorial Forest Divisions respectively. The Forest tract to the north and northeast of the reserve comes under the South Seoni Territorial Forest Division.

Administratively, the Tiger Reserve is divided into three Forest Ranges; Karmajhiri, Gumtara, and Kurai, nine Forest Circles; Alikatta, Dudhgaon, Gumtara, Kamreet, Karmajhiri, Kurai, Murer, Rukhad, and Pulpuldoh, 42 Forest Beats, and 162 Forest Compartments. The NH 44 (old NH 7), runs between Nagpur and Jabalpur along the eastern boundary of the reserve for around 10 km.

History

This area was described as extremely rich and diverse in wildlife from the earliest records available on the 16th century Deogarh kingdom (Kumar 1989). The scenic beauty and the floral and faunal diversity of the Central Indian Highlands have been well documented by the British since the late 17th century, e.g. Forsyth's (1919) "Highlands of Central India" (first published in 1871). Thereafter, Sterndale (1887) and Brander (1923) have added to the knowledge on the distribution of the flora, fauna and the local inhabitants of this tract.

The fictional works of Rudyard Kipling, The Jungle Book and The Second Jungle Book, are set in the region. Kipling himself never visited the area, instead basing his descriptions on other locations in India.

During the 17th century, the Gond rulers of this region cleared large tracts of forests for cultivation and dwellings. This onslaught continued up to 1818, through the rule by the Marathas and later under the British. It was not until 1862 that efforts were made to control the indiscriminate destruction and the forests were declared reserved (elaborated in Kumar 1989).

The Pench Sanctuary was created in September 1977, with an initial area of 449.39 km². The Pench National Park, recently renamed as Indira Priyadarshini Pench National Park, was created in 1983, carved out of the Sanctuary. The Tiger Reserve, 19th in the series, was formed under the Project Tiger scheme in November 1992.
 
It is notable that the Bor Wildlife Sanctuary and some adjacent protected areas will be merged with Pench Tiger Reserve (Maharashtra), as a 'Satellite core area', to more than double the area of that tiger reserve.

Geography
The Reserve lies in the southern lower reaches of the Satpura Range of hills on the southern border of Madhya Pradesh.

The general topography of Pench Tiger Reserve is mostly undulating, characterised by small ridges and hills having steep slopes, with a number of seasonal streams and nullahs carving the terrain into many folds and furrows, a result of the folding and upheavals of the past. The topography becomes flatter close to the Pench River. Most of the Tiger Reserve area falls under flat to gentle slope category (0-22 °) (Sankar et al. 2000b). The mean altitude is around 550 m above M.S.L. The geology of the area is mainly gneisses and basalt (see Shukla 1990 for details).

Climate
The Central Indian Highlands have a tropical monsoonal climate, with a distinct monsoon (July to September), winter (November to February) and summer (April to June).

The mean annual rainfall is around 1400 mm, with the south-west monsoon accounting for most of the rainfall in the region. For the dry season (November to May), the mean rainfall was 59.5 mm, and the temperature varies from a minimum of 0 °C in winter to 45 °C in summer (Sankar et al. 2000)

Hydrology

On the extreme southern boundary of the Tiger Reserve, a dam (Pench Hydroelectric Project) has been constructed on the Pench River. This dam forms the State boundary between Madhya Pradesh and Maharashtra. Because of this dam's reservoir, a sizeable proportion (54 km²) of the Tiger Reserve on the Madhya Pradesh side becomes submerged after the monsoonal rains. As summer approaches, these areas, from where the water gradually recedes downstream, become lush green meadows attracting high numbers of wild herbivores. During summer, the Pench River dries out leaving small pools of water locally known as "doh" or "khassa", which, besides the Pench reservoir, are the most important sources of water for the animals during this period. Artificial sources of water such as earthen tanks and check-dams (anicuts) also tend to dry out before the month of March, due to the inherent low water retention capacity of the soil. The Reserve management has also set up many hand-pumps and artificial water holes throughout the Reserve to serve as minor sources of water during the pinch summer months.

Flora
Pench Tiger Reserve belongs to the Indo-Malayan phytogeographical region. Ecologically, Pench is categorized as a tropical moist deciduous (TMD) tiger habitat. Floristically, Pench Tiger Reserve can be classified, according to Champion and Seth (1968) as:
Tropical Moist Deciduous Forests:
Type 3B/C1c Slightly moist teak forests
Tropical Dry Deciduous Forests:
Type 5A/C1b Dry teak forests
Type 5A/C3 Southern dry mixed deciduous forests

Teak is a ubiquitous species in the region, with a presence ranging from a sporadic distribution in most parts of the study area to localized teak-dominated patches. Teak (Tectona grandis), and associated species such as Madhuca indica, Diospyros melanoxylon, Terminalia tomentosa, Buchanania cochinchinensis, Lagerstroemia parviflora, Ougeinia dalbergoides, Miliusa velutina and Lannea coromandalica, occur on flat terrain. The undulating terrain and hill slopes have patches of Mixed Forest dominated by Boswellia serrata and Anogeissus latifolia. Species like Sterculia urens and Gardenia latifolia are found scattered on rocky slopes. Bamboo forests occur in the hill slopes and along streams. Some of the open patches of the Park are covered with tall grasses interspersed with Butea monosperma and Zizyphus mauritiana. Evergreen tree species like Terminalia arjuna, Syzygium cumini and Ixora parviflora are found in riparian vegetation along nullahs and river banks. Cleistanthus collinus dominant patches are also found in some parts of the Tiger Reserve.

The tracts that previously formed pastures of villages (subsequently relocated outside the National Park limits) now constitute open grassy meadows much favoured by the gregarious herbivores. With the approach of summer, the extent of open areas of the Reserve gradually increases with the recession of reservoir's waters.

Fauna

Zoogeographically, the Reserve falls in Oriental region. The carnivore fauna is represented by the Bengal tiger (Panthera tigris tigris), Indian leopard (Panthera pardus), dhole (Cuon alpinus), jungle cat (Felis chaus), and small Indian civet (Viverricula indica). Wolves (Canis lupus pallipes) occur on the fringes and outside the Reserve limits. Striped hyena (Hyaena hyaena), sloth bear (Melursus ursinus), golden jackal (Canis aureus), and Asian palm civet (Paradoxurus hermaphroditus) make up the rest of the carnivore fauna of the Reserve.

Chital (Axis axis), sambar (Cervus unicolor), gaur (Bos gaurus), nilgai (Boselaphus tragocamelus), wild pig (Sus scrofa), Indian muntjac (Muntiacus muntjac) and chowsingha (Tetraceros quadricornis), are the wild ungulate species found in the study area. Chital, sambar, nilgai and wild pigs are found all over the Tiger Reserve. With the distribution of water governing their movement patterns to a great extent, gaur migrate down from the hills during the dry season and occupy the forests along the Pench River and other sources of water, and migrate back to the hill forests during the 
monsoon. Nilgai are found mostly in a few open areas, along forest roads, scrub jungles and fringe areas of the Reserve. Chowsingha are more localized to the greatly undulating areas of the Reserve. Barking deer are seen infrequently in moist riverine stretches. Chinkara (Gazella bennetti) are infrequently seen on the open areas bordering and outside the Buffer Zone of the Reserve (e.g. Turia, Telia, and Dudhgaon).

The common northern plains gray langur (Semnopithecus entellus) and rhesus macaque (Macaca mulatta) represent the primate fauna of the area. The Indian porcupine (Hystrix indica), two species of mongoose viz. Indian grey mongoose (Urva edwardsii) and ruddy mongoose (Urva smithii), and Indian hare (Lepus nigricollis) also occur in this Tiger Reserve.

Research in Pench
Long-term research in Pench was initiated by the study on the interactions between wild animal and their habitat in the Pench Sanctuary by Shukla (1990). This was followed by a tiger-prey estimation study by Karanth and Nichols (1998). Since 1995 the Wildlife Institute of India has initiated a series of studies beginning with a long-term radio telemetry study on the gaur (Bos frontalis) (Sankar et al. 2000a), followed by the creation of a spatial mapping database for the Tiger Reserve (Sankar et al. 2000b).
Short-term Master's studies at the Wildlife Institute of India increased the knowledge on avifauna (Jayapal 1997), wild herbivores (Acharya 1997) tiger food habits and the diversity and distribution of the avifauna in Pench Tiger Reserve.

Threats 
Pench Tiger Reserve faces the usual conservation issues that afflict all Tiger Reserves of India. The first and foremost is the pressure of poaching. While poaching is essentially a law enforcement issue, the other critical concern remains the fact that habitat loss and fragmentation threaten Tiger Reserves such as Pench. As India develops and marches relentlessly along the path of development, the needs of wildlife and nature conservation appear to be often at loggerheads with the needs of economic development. An obvious example is the case regarding the widening of the critical national highway NH7 (now known as NH44), discussed in the section below.

There are documented reports of organized poaching gangs working in and around Pench Tiger Reserve. One of the most high-profile cases first appeared in 2013 when 11 tigers were reported to have been poached in the region of Central India by professional poachers belonging to the notorious Baheliya community of Katni (that is located close to Bandhavgarh Tiger Reserve). More recently, in 2016, a famous tigress in the tourism zone of Pench, named Baghinnaala female was killed by poisoning, along with her cubs (see section below). Another notorious series of incidents occurred in 2017

Famous tigers

One of the tigresses in the reserve, Badi Mada or Barimada ('Big Mother'), became well known for giving birth to 29 cubs over 17 years.

Collarwali, a daughter of Badi Mada, starred with her mother in the BBC Wildlife Special Tiger: Spy in the Jungle, which popularised the reserve. She became one of India's best known tigers, giving birth to 26 cubs in 7 litters  and 29 cubs in 8 litters by her death in January 2022 at the age of 16. Born in 2005 and initially dubbed T-15, she acquired the name Collarwali ('The One With a Collar') after being the first tigress in the park fitted with a radio collar, in 2008. She was unusually large for a female and because she was comparatively friendly, was the most frequently seen tiger in the park. In 2010 she gave birth to an unusually large litter, 5 cubs. Of Collarwali's cubs, records indicate 14 of the 18 born by 2013 and 17 of the 22 from her first 6 litters survived to adulthood. They have dispersed to other parts of Pench and some may have crossed over to other tiger reserves such as Kanha National Park. For example in December 2010,male T-39, born in her second litter in October 2008, travelled more than 50 km to near the boundary of the reserve. She died in January 2022 and was cremated by a local tribal leader.

The Baghin nala female or Baghinnalawali female, a littermate of Collarwali, was so-named because she established a territory close to a nullah (watercourse). Although shy, she was popular with tourists visiting Pench. However, on 28 and 29 March 2016, she and two 8-month-old cubs were found dead inside the core area of the tiger reserve, not far from a patrolling camp. Post-mortem examination confirmed poisoning, and three men were arrested in early April, suspected of poisoning a deer that the tigers had eaten.

References

Works cited
 Acharya, B. B. 1997. Habitat Occupancy by Wild Ungulates In Pench Tiger Reserve, Madhya Pradesh. M.Sc. Thesis. Saurashtra University, Rajkot.
Pench Tiger Reserve in Maharashtra State by Ocean Software Technologies
 Acharya, B. B. 2008. The Ecology of the Dhole or Asiatic Wild Dog (Cuon alpinus) in Pench Tiger Reserve, Madhya Pradesh. Ph.D. Thesis. Saurashtra University, Rajkot.
 Champion, H. G., and S. K. Seth. 1968. A Revised Survey of the Forest Types of India. Manager of Publications, Government of India, New Delhi.
 Forsyth, J. 1919. The Highlands of Central India: Notes on the Forests and Wild Tribes, Natural History and Sports. Chapman and Hall, London, (First published 1871).
 Jayapal, R. 1997. A Study On Bird Communities-Habitat Structure Relationships In Pench National Park, M.P. M.Sc. Thesis. Saurashtra University, Rajkot.
 
 Kumar, S. 1989. Management Plan of Pench Tiger Reserve, Madhya Pradesh (1990–1995). Unpublished. Madhya Pradesh Forest Department.
 Sankar, K., Q. Qureshi, M.K.S. Pasha, and G. Areendran, G. 2000a. Ecology of gaur Bos gaurus in Pench Tiger Reserve, Madhya Pradesh. Final Report. Wildlife Institute of India, Dehra Dun.
 Sankar, K., Q. Quresh, V.B. Mathur, S.K. Mukherjee, G. Areendran, M.K.S. Pasha, R. Thapa and P. Lal. 2000b. Mapping of the Protected Area (PA) and surrounding areas in Pench Tiger Reserve, Madhya Pradesh. Wildlife Institute of India, Dehradun
 Shukla, R. 1990. An ecological study of interactions between wild animals and vegetation in Pench Wildlife Sanctuary and its environs. Ph.D. Thesis, Dr. Harisingh Gour Vishwavidyalaya, Sagar. 249 p.
 Sterndale, R. A. 1887. Seonee, or Camp Life on the Satpura Range. Thacker, Spink and Co., Calcutta and Simla.

Tiger reserves of India
Wildlife sanctuaries in Madhya Pradesh
Chhindwara district
Seoni district
1977 establishments in Madhya Pradesh
Protected areas established in 1977